Rajendra Sukhanand Patni (born 19 June 1964) is an Indian politician of the Bharatiya Janata Party (BJP). He is a Member of the Legislative Assembly from Karanja constituency from Washim District in Maharashtra. In 2014 Legislative Assembly Elections of Maharashtra, Rajendra Patni won from Karanja Constituency. He was also the member of legislative Council from 1997 to 2003. He won the 2004 Legislative Assembly elections from Karanja. In 2009 he lost election and it is said that the loss was due to the oppose by some Shiv Sena leaders itself and due to increasing casteism as he belongs to minority. He is said to be very studious politician continuously doing positive changes for Washim District. In September 2011, he denied for working for shiv sena in the upcoming municipal council elections due to some internal problems with other party leaders of the districts and formed his own union of candidates known as "Washim Zilla Vikas Aaghadi". Shiv Sena suffered a great setback and loss due to his exit as he took with him a huge number of party workers and the votes of the masses.

Washim Jilha Vikas Aaghadi under his leadership contested Washim Municipal Council Elections in 2011 and came out as a largest party winning 12 out of 27 seats. He also succeeded in making the President of the Municipal Council in 2011 and also in 2014.
For 2014 Legislative Assembly elections he was invited to contest from Karanja Constituency as a BJP Candidate. He won the election by more than 4000 votes. In 2019, he recontested the Assembly elections from Karanja Manora Constituency on a BJP ticket. He won the election with a record margin of around 23000 votes. With this victory, became the first MLA to get elected thrice from this constituency since the independence. His development work, it is believed, propelled him to this victory.

Within BJP 

President, Washim District BJP, (Since 2016)

Legislative career 

Elected to Maharashtra Legislative Council - 1997 to 2003 (1st Term)
Elected to Maharashtra Legislative Assembly - 2004 to 2009 (1st Term)
Re-Elected to Maharashtra Legislative Assembly - 2014 to 2019 (2nd Term)  
Re-Elected to Maharashtra Legislative Assembly - 2019 to 2024 (3rd Term)

References

1964 births
Living people
Shiv Sena politicians
Maharashtra MLAs 2004–2009
People from Washim district
Maharashtra MLAs 2014–2019
Bharatiya Janata Party politicians from Maharashtra
Maharashtra MLAs 2019–2024